Seyyed Mohammad Bagher Borghei Modarres; July 2, 1986 is an Iranian linguist, critic, cineast and religious scholar.
He is the son of Ayatollah Seyyed Reza Borghei Modarres, one of the apostles and companions of Ayatollah Ruhollah Khomeini, who died on March 5, 2016.

Early life
Modarres was born in Tehran, Iran in 1986. His father, Ayatollah Seyyed Reza Borghei, was the representative of Ayatollah Khomeini in the Persian Gulf countries. Therefore, he spent his childhood in Dubai, United Arab Emirates. At the beginning of his primary school years they moved to Qom. Before the end of primary school he won third place in the National Scientific Olympiad in Iran, and after that he passed the entrance examination for the school of special talented students under the supervision of the National Organization for Development of Exceptional Talents.

Education and career
He got his bachelor's degree in English language and literature and master's degree in linguistics and continued his studies in the field of linguistics, earning his doctorate. While at university, he participated in dramaturgy and theatre direction courses and learned filmmaking and acting in short movies. He has written some plays for other directors. He started to lecture in universities in 2010.

Several translations, compilations and writings of his have been published in the fields of language, linguistics, semiotics, translation, and religious and Qur'anic studies in different languages. His most recent publication was a translation of the book Stylistics, A Practical Coursebook in Elmi Farhangi Publication.
Most of his studies have focused on English, Arabic and Persian. , he is a faculty member in the language, linguistics and translation department in the Research Center for Proximity Studies, and he is the vice editor in chief and managing editor of the journals Quran and Linguistic Studies under the supervision of University of Science and education of the Quran  and Risalatut Taqrib under the supervision of the World Assembly for Approximation of Islamic Schools of thought.

Works

Articles
 Analysis of Information Structure in English Translation of the Holy Quran/ (Journal of Quran and Linguistic Studies)
 Translation of the Holy Quran from the Perspective of Word Order, Discourse Analysis and Information Structure (Journal of Interdisciplinary Translation Studies)
 Analysis of Translation of Quranic Metaphors into English (Journal of Quran and Linguistic Studies)
 Stylistic Characteristics of the Holy Quran (Specialized Journal of Literature and Art, Afarineh)
 Translation of Quranic metaphors (Specialized Journal of Literature and Art, Afarineh)
 Semiotic Analysis of film: A case study of the Movie "Rosvaei" (Specialized Journal of Literature and Art, Afarineh)
 Izutsu's Quranic Semantics (Specialized Journal of Literature and Art, Afarineh)
 Psychological and Spiritual Effects of Intimacy with the Holy Quran, 28th International Competition of the Holy Quran, Tehran, 2011.
 Analysis of theme-rheme arrangement in English Translation of the holy Quran, The first International Conference of Interdisciplinary Studies of Translation, Mashhad, Iran, 2013.
 Reviewing Job Titles in the Original Text and Translation of "Karname-ye Ardashir-e Babakan"
 Book Review: Persian by Shahrzad Mahootian.
 Reinterpretation of Meaning-Based Theory of Translation Based on the Different Functions of Language in Different Types of texts, 2008.
 Research Methods in Discourse Analysis.

Books

As author
 Linguistics and Advertisement, Armaghan publications.
 Linguistics and Brand, Armaghan publications.
 General English, Armaghan publications. 
 Talk to Learn English (1, 2, 3), Armaghan publications.

As translator
 Authenticity of Nahj al-Balaghah, Institute of Islamic Studies, Canada.
 Meaning-Based Translation, Armaghan publications.
 Stylistics: A Practical Coursebook, Laura Wright and Jonathan Hope, Elmi Farhangi publications.
 Get a Name!, Jacky Tai, Armaghan publications.
 Describing Discourse, Nicholas Wood, Nevise-ye Parsi Publications

References

1986 births
Living people
Linguists from Iran
Semanticists
Semioticians
People from Tehran
Iranian translators
Iranian academics